Robert Dingwall (R.D.) Zimmerman (born August 8, 1952) is an American author of mysteries, psychological thrillers, and children's books.  He has won several literary awards.

Early life 
He was raised in the Chicago area, and currently resides in Minneapolis, MN.

Books

Todd Mills series 
Closet (Oct 1994)
Tribe (Aug 1996)
Hostage (Oct 1997)
Outburst (Oct 1998)
Innuendo (Nov 1999)

Alex & Maddy Phillips series
Death Trance (Oct 1992)
Blood Trance (Jun 1993)
Red Trance (Jul 1994)

Tsarist Russian series
(written under the pen name Robert Alexander)
The Kitchen Boy: A Novel of the Last Tsar
Rasputin's Daughter

Other books
The Cross and the Sickle (Jan 1984)
The Red Encounter (Sep 1986)
Murder Most Artful (Mar 1987)
Blood Russian (Oct 1987)
Mindscream (Jul 1989)
Deadfall in Berlin (Sep 1990)

Awards

References

External links 
 

20th-century American novelists
American male novelists
American mystery writers
American children's writers
American gay writers
1952 births
Living people
Lambda Literary Award winners
American LGBT novelists
20th-century American male writers